In Between Jobs is the third album by British R&B singer Lynden David Hall, released in April 2005 on the Random Records label.  The album peaked at #188 on the UK album chart.  It was the last album Hall released prior to his death in February 2006. It was re-released on 15 July 2013, including a previously unreleased bonus track entitled "Promise".

Track listing

Original 2005 release
All tracks composed by Lynden David Hall

 "Don't Hide Your Heart" – 3:32  
 "Stay Faithful" – 4:32  
 "In Between Jobs" – 3:56  
 "Pimps, Playas and Hustlers" – 4:53  
 "Day Off" – 3:57  
 "Still Here with You" – 4:53  
 "Eventually" (feat. Me One) – 4:03  
 "Memories and Souvenirs" – 3:48  
 "(If You Ain't) Comfortable" – 4:36  
 "Blessings" – 6:08

2013 re-release

All tracks composed by Lynden David Hall

 "Don't Hide Your Heart" – 3:32  
 "Stay Faithful" – 4:32  
 "In Between Jobs" – 3:56  
 "Pimps, Playas and Hustlers" – 4:53  
 "Day Off" – 3:57  
 "Still Here with You" – 4:53  
 "Eventually" (feat. Me One) – 4:03  
 "Memories and Souvenirs" – 3:48  
 "(If You Ain't) Comfortable" – 4:36  
 "Blessings" – 6:08
 "Promise" – 4:41

Lynden David Hall albums
2005 albums